This is a list of compositions by William Walton sorted by genre, date of composition, title, and scoring.

Sources
 

Walton, William